The Calabozoidea or Calabozoida are a suborder of freshwater isopod crustaceans.

Families

The suborder contains two families:

Family Brasileirinidae 
Family Calabozoidae

References

Isopoda
Arthropod suborders